Danko is a given name, a diminutive of Daniel in South Slavic languages.

Danko (singer), (born 1969), Russian pop singer
Danko Bošković (born 1982), German footballer
Danko Cvjetićanin (born 1963), Croatian basketball player
Danko Grlić (1923–1984), Yugoslavian marxist writer
Danko Herceg (born 1974), Croatian slalom canoer
 Danko Jones, Canadian musician
Danko Kovačević (born 1991), Montenegrin footballer
Danko Marinelli (born 1987), Croatian alpine skier
Danko Matrljan (born 1960), Croatian footballer
Danko Lazović (born 1983), Serbian footballer
Danko Ljuština (born 1952), Croatian actor
Danko Opančina (born 1990), Serbian footballer
Danko Popović (1928–2009), Serbian writer and playwright
Danko Sipka (born 1962) lexicographer

Fictional characters
Danko, the hero from a legend in the story "Old Izergil" by Maxim Gorky

Slavic masculine given names
Serbian masculine given names
Croatian masculine given names